Mochowo  is a village in Sierpc County, Masovian Voivodeship, in east-central Poland. It is the seat of the gmina (administrative district) called Gmina Mochowo.

The village has a population of 310.

References

Mochowo